Jim Fielder (born October 4, 1947 in Denton, Texas) is an American bassist, best known for his work as an original member of Blood, Sweat & Tears.

Fielder attended Loara High School in Anaheim, California. While at Loara, the young Fielder befriended classmates Tim Buckley and Larry Beckett, a relationship that would launch Fielder into the music industry. Prior to joining BS&T he worked with Buckley, and he played in several other notable bands including Mastin & Brewer with Mike Brewer and Billy Mundi, Frank Zappa & The Mothers of Invention (for whom he played rhythm guitar), and Buffalo Springfield.

Since he departed from BS&T, Fielder has worked extensively in the music industry both studio and live performances, and for 40+ years was a standing member of Neil Sedaka's band.

Discography

All albums are with Blood, Sweat & Tears unless otherwise noted.

 Tim Buckley (1966) - with Tim Buckley
 Absolutely Free (1966) – with The Mothers of Invention
 Buffalo Springfield Again (1967) – with Buffalo Springfield on "Everydays"
 Child Is Father to the Man (1968) – Blood, Sweat & Tears : RIAA Gold, #47
 Tell It Like It Is (A&M/CTI, 1969) – with George Benson
 Blood, Sweat & Tears (1968) – 1970 Grammy Award for Album of the Year, RIAA 4 x Multi-Platinum–, #1
 Blood, Sweat & Tears 3 (1970) – RIAA Gold, #1
 Blood, Sweat & Tears 4 (1971) – RIAA Gold, #10
 New Blood (1972) – #32
 No Sweat (1973) – #72
 What Goes Up! The Best of Blood, Sweat & Tears (1995)

References

External links
[ Jim Fielder at AllMusicGuide.com]

1947 births
 Living people
 American rock bass guitarists
 American male bass guitarists
 American rock guitarists
 Rhythm guitarists
 Musicians from Anaheim, California
 People from Denton, Texas
 The Mothers of Invention members
 Blood, Sweat & Tears members
 Guitarists from California
 American male guitarists
20th-century American bass guitarists